Transportation in Israel is based mainly on private motor vehicles and bus service and an expanding railway network. A lack of inland waterways and the small size of the country make air and water transport of only minor importance in domestic transportation, but they are vitally important for Israel's international transport links. Demands of population growth, political factors, the Israel Defense Forces, tourism and increased traffic set the pace for all sectors, being a major driver in the mobility transition towards railways and public transit while moving away from motorized road transport.
All facets of transportation in Israel are under the supervision of the Ministry of Transport and Road Safety.

Private transportation

Roads

The network spans the whole country.

Route 1 between Jerusalem and Tel Aviv and Route 2 between Tel Aviv and Haifa are well maintained highways.

Cycling

Tel Aviv has a growing network of bike paths, with more than over 360 kilometers (224 miles) existing or planned. In April 2011, Tel Aviv municipality launched Tel-O-Fun, a bicycle sharing system, in which 150 stations of bicycles for rent were installed within the city limits. Jerusalem has over 125 kilometers (78 miles) of cycleways, either existing or planned.

National Bike Trail

The National Bike Trail, when completed will take riders from the southern city of Eilat to the border with Lebanon, passing though Jerusalem, Tel Aviv and several other cities.

Ofnidan (Greater Tel Aviv Cycle Network)

As of 2021, construction was underway on Ofnidan, a cycle network of seven inter-urban routes connecting the cities of the Tel Aviv Metropolitan Area, with some segments already open.

Public transportation

Bus service 

Buses are the country's main form of public transport. In 2017, bus passenger trips totaled approximately 740 million. In 2009, 16 companies operated buses for public transport, totaling 5,939 buses and 8,470 drivers. Egged is Israel's largest bus company, and operates routes throughout the country. Bus routes in some areas are operated by smaller carriers, the largest being the Dan Bus Company, operating routes in Gush Dan. Kavim is the next largest.

Bus stations in Israel, other than standalone bus stops, come in two types: terminals (masof, pl. mesofim) and central stations (tahana merkazit). Each terminal serves a number of routes, usually over a dozen, while a central station may serve over a hundred bus routes. The largest central bus terminal in the country is the Tel Aviv Central Bus Station, which is also the second largest bus terminal in the world.

On August 5, 2010, the Ministry of Transport opened a website that contained information about public bus and train routes in the country. Previously, information was given only by the individual public transit operators.

Bus rapid transit 
Israel has one bus rapid transit system in Haifa, called the Metronit, which consists of three lines connecting Haifa to its suburbs. In addition, there are BRT feeder lines to the Jerusalem Light Rail, running on dedicated bus lanes from Southern Jerusalem to the Northern Jerusalem neighborhood of Ramot crossing the light rail line at the intersection of Jaffa and King George Streets.

Share taxis 
Israel also has a share taxi service (sherut), run by several private companies, depending on location, in addition to regular taxicab services. The shared sherut service usually appears a yellow minivans and travel along the same path as the normal buses with identical route numbers. For a slightly higher price, the shared sherut service allows passengers to both hop on and hop off anywhere along the path of travel. During peak travel, often the time of travel can be shortened as the number of passengers is significantly small compared to normal bus services. Some routes continue to travel through the night and on Shabbat providing transport needs to the population when normal buses services cease. The beginning and end of the sherut vans may differ from the central bus station and on the weekends and evenings, the routes can also be altered for some services. In 2015, share taxis carried 34.7 million passengers, 15.2 million of which were transported on city routes, with the rest going to suburban and inter-city routes.

Private taxis 

Taxis, often called "special taxis" in Israel, to distinguish them from share taxis, are regulated by the Ministry of Transport. Aside from individual taxi companies, Gett is the primary digital taxi hailing service in the country. In 2017, approximately 90 million rides were made using taxis.

Railways

 Total: 1,384 km  (standard gauge). In 2017 there were over 64 million passenger rides taken.

Many of Israel's railway lines were constructed before the founding of the state during Ottoman and British rule. The first line was the Jaffa–Jerusalem railway, followed by the Jezreel Valley railway, which formed part of the greater Hejaz railway. World War I brought the creation of multiple new lines out of military needs: Portions of what is now the Coastal railway were built simultaneously by the Turkish and British and later merged during the British Mandate. Southern lines were also built by the warring states—from the north by the Ottomans, and from Rafah in the west by the British.

Beginning in the mid-1960s, railway development stagnated, and a number of lines (notably, the Jezreel Valley railway and most of the Eastern railway) were abandoned altogether.  Development restarted in the 1990s, the opening of Tel Aviv's Ayalon railway in 1993 signaling a new era of rail development. Lines under construction in the 2000s include the high-speed railway to Jerusalem, an extension of the coastal railway directly from Tel Aviv to Ashdod through the northern Shephelah, and a line from Ashkelon to Beersheba via Sderot, Netivot and Ofakim, as well as a complete reconstruction of the line from Lod to Beersheba. These and other extensive infrastructure improvements led to a 20-fold increase in the number of passengers served by Israel Railways between 1990 and 2015.

After numerous delays due to the complexity of the project, a new line between Tel Aviv and Jerusalem opened in 2019. This line is the first electrified railway ever built in the country. Israel Railways has ordered Bombardier Traxx electric locomotives for use on this line and for other lines to be converted to electric operation. All existing and future electrified mainline railways in Israel use 25 kV 50 Hz overhead electrification.

Light rail/subway

The 13-kilometre-long Jerusalem Light Rail system began operation in August 2011 and is being extended. The construction of the Tel Aviv Light Rail and the Tel Aviv Metro, serving Tel Aviv and surrounding cities, in underway and the first line, the Red Line, is set to open in 2023. A significant portion of it will be underground.

Haifa's Carmelit, an underground funicular railway, is currently the only subway line in Israel. It is listed in Guinness World Records as the shortest subway system in the world, being the second smallest track network (after the Tünel in Istanbul,) but being the smallest "system" by virtue of being the only urban rail network in the city. The Haifa–Nazareth railway, a planned light rail system from Haifa to Nazareth, is planned to open in 2025, and a light rail system in Beersheba is currently planned.

Israel Public Transportation Statistics
The average amount of time people spend commuting with public transit in Israel, for example to and from work, on a weekday is 70 min. 22% of public transit riders, ride for more than 2 hours every day. The average amount of time people wait at a stop or station for public transit is 16 min, while 25% of riders wait for over 20 minutes on average every day. The average distance people usually ride in a single trip with public transit is 13.6 km, while 29.% travel for over 12 km in a single direction.

Air transport 

Israel has 47 airports, the largest and most well known being Ben Gurion Airport (TLV) located near Tel Aviv, which is used by most international flights to Israel. In 2017, Ben Gurion Airport handled nearly 21 million passengers and was the busiest airport in the Eastern Mediterranean in terms of international passengers served. Non-stop flights from Israel travel to North America, Europe, Africa, the Far East, and neighboring countries in the Middle East. Scheduled domestic air service is available between Tel Aviv's Ben Gurion Airport and Haifa, Rosh Pina, the Golan Heights, and the southern city of Eilat. Some international charter and low cost flights also land at Eilat Ramon Airport. Ramon Airport opened in 2019 20 km north of Eilat replacing the existing Uvda and Eilat airports. While Uvda reverted to its use as a military airbase upon the opening of Ramon Airport, the old Eilat "city" airport was shut down with the land to be redeveloped.

According to the Israel Civil Aviation Authority, as of 2012, Israel's civil aircraft fleet consisted of 59 aircraft; 56 passenger planes, and 3 freighters. 48 of these were Boeing jets, 2 Airbus, 8 turbo-prop produced by ATR, and 1 Embraer jet. Israeli airlines ordered another 2 Embraer jets, 1 ATR airplane, 5 Airbus jets, and 10 Boeing jets, a total of 18 aircraft. It is estimated that Israeli airlines will have 65-70 craft in 2017–2018. Airlines include El Al, Sun D'Or, Arkia and Israir Airlines. Boeing estimates that 60-80 new aircraft will be purchased by Israeli airlines over the next 20 years.

Israel has 29 airports with paved runways, 18 unpaved landing strips, and 3 heliports.

Ports and harbors

Mediterranean Sea 

 Ashdod Port
 Haifa Port

Red Sea 
On the Gulf of Eilat:
 Eilat Port

Merchant marine 
 Ships by type: Cargo ship 1, Chemical tanker 1, Container ship 16 (2006)
Many ships owned and operated by Israeli companies operate under foreign registries. Israel's Zim Integrated Shipping Services is one of the largest shipping companies in the world.

Cable cars 

There are six tourist and leisure oriented cable car systems in Israel. These include the cable car in Haifa connecting Bat Galim on the coast to the Stella Maris observation deck and monastery atop Mount Carmel., the cable car in Kiryat Shmona, linking it to Menara 400 meters above the town, the chairlifts and cable cars in the Mount Hermon ski resort in the Golan Heights, the cable car to Masada, near the Dead Sea, enabling tourists to quickly reach the mountain top site, and the cable car at the Rosh HaNikra grottoes site, going down to the chalk cliff and cavernous tunnels on the Mediterranean coast. In addition to that, the Superland amusement park near Rishon LeZion has its own cable car and a public transport-oriented cable car is being developed in Haifa—the Haifa Cable Car.

Additional future plans include a system in western Haifa, and systems in Tiberias, Ma'alot-Tarshiha, Jerusalem and Ma'ale Adumim.

Segway 
In 2006, the Segway scooter was approved for use on sidewalks and other pedestrian designated locations, as well as roads that have no sidewalks, obstructed sidewalks or sidewalks lacking curb cuts. The user must be over 16 years old. No license is required. Companies offering tours of Jerusalem  use the second generation i2 model, equipped with Lean Steer Technology that facilitates ski-like steering.

See also
 Plug-in electric vehicles in Israel

References

External links 
 Ministry of Transport
 Transport Today and Tomorrow